Hngettwin Nikaya, officially Catubhummika Mahāsatipaṭṭhana Nikāya is the name of a monastic order of monks in Burma, primarily in Mandalay. Founded in the mid-19th century by the abbot of the Hngettwin Monastery, it is one of 9 legally sanctioned monastic orders (nikaya) in the country, under the 1990 Law Concerning Sangha Organizations. Hngettwin Nikaya is a very orthodox order, with a minimalist and austere approach to Buddhist rituals found in Burma, not recognizing any rituals inconsistent with Buddhist doctrine, including nat spirit worship. For instance, members of this order do not worship or venerate the image of Buddha, but rather his memory and teachings.

Statistics

According to 2016 statistics published by the State Sangha Maha Nayaka Committee, 1,445 monks belonged to this monastic order, representing 0.27% of all monks in the country, making it the fourth smallest legally-sanctioned monastic order. With respect to geographic representation, the plurality of Hngettwin monks are based in Yangon Region (31.90%), followed by Mandalay Region (24.57%), Ayeyarwady Region (17.92%).

References

See also
Thudhamma Nikaya
Shwegyin Nikaya
Dwara Nikaya
Nikaya
Buddhism in Burma

Theravada Buddhist orders
Schools of Buddhism founded in Myanmar